Room Service is a 1979 Thames Television comedy series written by Jimmy Perry without his usual writing partner David Croft.  It and Perry's other work without Croft, High Street Blues (1989, co-written with Robin Carr) "remain contenders for the title of worst British sitcom".  The cast included Penelope Nice, Bryan Pringle and Matthew Kelly.

DVD release 
The Complete series was released on DVD on 27 April 2015.

Notes and references

ITV sitcoms
1979 British television series debuts
1979 British television series endings
1970s British sitcoms
English-language television shows
Television shows produced by Thames Television
Television series by Fremantle (company)